Una McCormack (born 13 January 1972) is a British-Irish academic, scriptwriter and novelist. She is the author of The Baba Yaga (2015) and The Star of the Sea (2016), two books in the Weird Space series from UK science fiction publisher Abaddon Books.

McCormack taught at Anglia Ruskin University, as a lecturer in creative writing. She was also a co-director of the Anglia Ruskin University Centre for Science Fiction and Fantasy. She is best known as the author of numerous tie-in novels based on the science fiction TV series Star Trek and Doctor Who.

Early life
McCormack was born on 13 January 1972 in St Helens, Merseyside. She is the youngest of six children born to Gerald James McCormack and Kathleen McCormack (née Towey), both primary school teachers. She was educated at Carmel College, St Helens, then studied for a BA in History and Social and Political Science at Newnham College, Cambridge, followed by an MSc in Psychology at the University of Reading and a PhD in Sociology at the University of Surrey.

Published works
McCormack's first professionally published fiction was a short story, "A Time and a Place", published in issue 197 of Doctor Who Magazine in 1993.

Her fan fiction based on the television series Star Trek: Deep Space Nine led to her being commissioned to write a story, "Face Value", for the Prophet and Change anthology collection published by Pocket Books in 2003. Her first DS9 novel, Cardassia: The Lotus Flower, was published in 2004. This was followed by five more Star Trek novels: Hollow Men (2005) The Never-Ending Sacrifice (2009), Brinkmanship (2012), the New York Times bestselling The Fall: The Crimson Shadow (2013) and The Missing (2014). Her latest DS9 novel, Enigma Tales, was published in 2017.

She's also written two Star Trek Discovery novels, The Way to the Stars (2019) and Wonderlands (2021), the first Picard novel, The Last Best Hope (2020), and the "Autobiographies" of Kathryn Janeway (2020) and Mr Spock (2021).

She has written four Doctor Who novels for the official New Series Adventures range published by BBC Books: The King's Dragon (2010), The Way Through the Woods (2011), Royal Blood (2015) and Molten Heart (2018), and another Doctor Who novel, All Flesh is Grass (2020), for the Time Lord Victorious multi-platform story event.

McCormack wrote the original Firefly novel Carnival, published by Titan Books in November 2021. 

McCormack has also written The Undefeated, a work of original fiction, published in May 2019.

McCormack has also written numerous audio dramas, based on Doctor Who, Star Cops and Blake's 7, for Big Finish Productions.

Personal life
McCormack lives in Cambridge with her partner Matthew and their daughter.

Notes

External links
Official website

1972 births
Academics of Anglia Ruskin University
Alumni of Newnham College, Cambridge
Living people
British women novelists
21st-century British novelists
Writers of Doctor Who novels